Igor Tsel (born 24 August 1977) is a Kazakhstani fencer. He competed in the individual sabre event at the 2000 Summer Olympics.

References

External links
 

1977 births
Living people
Kazakhstani male sabre fencers
Olympic fencers of Kazakhstan
Fencers at the 2000 Summer Olympics
Asian Games medalists in fencing
Fencers at the 1998 Asian Games
Fencers at the 2002 Asian Games
Fencers at the 2006 Asian Games
Asian Games bronze medalists for Kazakhstan
Medalists at the 2002 Asian Games
21st-century Kazakhstani people